The women's pole vault at the 2022 World Athletics Championships was held at the Hayward Field in Eugene on 15 and 17 July 2022.

Summary

Out of 15 finalists, 7 survived to 4.60m, 5 of them still with perfect rounds going.  By 4.70m, only 5 got over the bar, Olympic Champion Katie Nageotte needing two attempts, and 2016 Olympic Champion Katerina Stefanidi making it on her third and last attempt.  Only Sandi Morris remained perfect.  At 4.80m, Tina Šutej, Stefanidi and Nageotte missed their first attempt, while Nina Kennedy and Morris made it on their first attempt, putting Kennedy in second place behind Morris.  Nageotte made her second attempt, Stefanidi strategically passed to the next height and Šutej exhausted her attempts.  At 4.85m, Nageotte made her first attempt to leap from third into the lead.  Both Kennedy and Morris aborted their first attempts mid-air going under the bar, while Stefanidi missed.  On her second attempt, Morris had a little brush on the way down, but the bar stayed up.  Kennedy had a credible near miss at what would have been a new personal best.  When she went under the bar on her final attempt, she dropped back to her last clearance at 4.70m to finish behind Šutej in fifth place.  Kennedy passed her third attempt for an all or nothing jump at 4.90m but couldn't hit her marks under the pressure, running under the bar still collecting the bronze.  Nageotte and Morris each made their three attempts at 4.90m, Morris coming the closest on her second attempt, but the results reverted to their final clearances at 4.85m, with Nageotte confirming her gold from the Olympics.

Records
Before the competition records were as follows:

Qualification standard
The standard to qualify automatically for entry was 4.70 m.

Schedule
The event schedule, in local time (UTC−7), was as follows:

Results

Qualification 

Qualification: 4.65 m (Q) or at least 12 best performers (q).

Final 
The final was started on 17 July at 17:10.

References

Pole vault
Pole vault at the World Athletics Championships